Independence Blue Cross (Independence) is a health insurer based in Philadelphia, Pennsylvania, in the United States.  Independence is the largest health insurer in the Philadelphia area, serving  people in the region and seven million nationwide.

Employing more than 10,000 people, the company offers a wide variety of health plans, including managed care, and traditional indemnity insurance. Its network of health care providers includes nearly 160 area hospitals and more than 42,000 physicians and other health care professionals.

Independence is an independent licensee of the Blue Cross and Blue Shield Association.

Company history
Independence Blue Cross began in 1938 as the Associated Hospital Service of Philadelphia and offered the first prepaid hospitalization plan in the region. Philadelphia Mayor S. Davis Wilson enrolled as the first member, and Independence Hall became the first employer group to purchase coverage.

By the end of its first year, the company had more than 160,000 members. By 1958, it employed 600 people and contracted with 94 hospitals. In 1964, the company changed its name to Blue Cross of Greater Philadelphia and in 1988, began doing business as Independence Blue Cross.

In October 2011, Independence launched a private, charitable foundation — the Independence Blue Cross Foundation.

Subsidiaries and affiliates 
In addition to health care benefits, Independence Blue Cross offers specialized services and managed care through its affiliates and subsidiaries.

 QCC Insurance Company
 Keystone Health Plan East
 Independence Administrators
 AmeriHealth
 AmeriHealth Administrators
 AmeriHealth Casualty
 AmeriHealth Caritas
 CompServices, Inc.
 NaviNet, Inc.

External links

Health Insurance Plans

References

Financial services companies established in 1938
Healthcare in Philadelphia
Companies based in Philadelphia
Health care companies based in Pennsylvania
Health maintenance organizations
Medical and health organizations based in Pennsylvania
Organizations established in 1938
Members of Blue Cross Blue Shield Association